Albert Newton (13 March 1894 – 1975) was an English professional footballer who made 229 appearances in the Football League playing as an outside left.

Career
Newton was born in Barnsley. He began his career with Barnsley St George's, and moved on to Barnsley, for whom he made 225 appearances in the Football League Second Division. He joined Bradford City in May 1926. He made 4 league appearances for the club. He was released by the club in October 1926.

Newton died in 1975.

Sources

References

1894 births
1975 deaths
Footballers from Barnsley
English footballers
Association football outside forwards
Barnsley F.C. players
Bradford City A.F.C. players
English Football League players